Shelby Rogers was the defending champion, but decided not to participate.

Madison Brengle won the title, defeating Nicole Gibbs in the final, 6–3, 6–4.

Seeds

Main draw

Finals

Top half

Bottom half

References 
 Main draw

Kentucky Bank Tennis Championships - Women's Singles
2014 WS